Bland Barksdale Massie (November 10, 1854 – January 8, 1924) was an American Democratic politician who served as a member of the Virginia Senate, representing the state's 19th district. He was born at Pharsalia in Nelson County.

References

External links

1854 births
1924 deaths
Democratic Party members of the Virginia House of Delegates
Democratic Party Virginia state senators
People from Nelson County, Virginia